Yan Peng may refer to:
 Yan Peng (footballer)
 Yan Peng (basketball)